Annemarie Jacir is a Palestinian filmmaker, writer, and producer.

Career

Filmmaker
She has been working in independent cinema since 1998 and has written, directed and produced a number of award-winning films. Two of her films have premiered as Official Selections in Cannes, one in Berlin and in Venice, Locarno, Rotterdam, Toronto, and Telluride. All three of her feature films were selected as Palestine's Oscar Entry for Foreign Language Film. Her short film, like twenty impossibles was the first Arab short film to ever be an official selection of the Cannes International Film Festival and went on to be a Student Academy Awards Finalist, winning more than 15 awards at International festivals including Best Film at the Palm Springs International Festival of Short Films, Chicago International Film Festival, Institute Du Monde Arabe Biennale, Mannheim-Heidelberg Film Festival, and IFP/New York. like twenty impossibles was named one of the ten best films of 2003 by Gavin Smith of Film Comment Magazine (Editors Choice) is a fiction film which wryly questions artistic responsibility as a Palestinian film crew navigates various obstacles of the Israeli military occupation.

In 2007, Jacir shot the first feature film by a Palestinian woman director, the acclaimed Salt of this Sea, the story of a working-class American woman whose parents were Palestinian refugees, making her first return to her family's homeland. Her second work to debut in Cannes Film Festival, Salt of this Sea, went on to win the FIPRESCI Critics Award, and garnered fourteen other international awards including Best Film in Milan. The film was Palestine's submission to the 81st Academy Awards for the Academy Award for Best Foreign Language Film and received many other awards and nominations including winning the Muhr Arab Award for Best Screenplay at the Dubai International Film Festival, a Cinema in Motion award at the 55th San Sebastian International Film Festival and a FIPRESCI award. Salt of this Sea starred poet Suheir Hammad alongside Saleh Bakri in his first role on screen.

Her second feature When I Saw You won Best Asian Film at the Berlinale, Best Arab Film in Abu Dhabi and Best Film in Amiens, Phoenix, and Olympia, and garnered a nomination at the Asian Pacific Screen Awards. Working in both fiction and documentary, other films include Until When, A Few Crumbs for the Birds, which she also shot as cinematographer, and experimentala Post Oslo History. She was named one of Filmmaker magazine's 25 New Faces of Independent Cinema.

In 2011, renown Chinese director Zhang Yimou selected her to be his first protégée as part of the Rolex Arts Initiative. With a commitment to teaching, training and hiring locally, Annemarie also curates, actively promoting independent cinema in the region.  Founder of Philistine Films, she collaborates regularly as an editor, screenwriter and occasional producer with fellow filmmakers. She teaches screenwriting and works as a freelance editor as well as consultant. Her most recent film Wajib (2017) won 36 international awards including Best Film in Mar Del Plata, Dubai, Amiens, DC Film Festival and Kerala and jury mention at the London BFI Festival.

In 2018, she returned to the Cannes Film Festival, this time joining the Un Certain Regard Jury, presided by Puerto Rican/American actor Benicio del Toro. In 2020, she was part of the Competition jury of the Berlin International Film Festival, presided by English actor Jeremy Irons

She is a member of the Asian Pacific Screen Academy and a board member of Palestine Cinema Days. She has taught at Columbia University, Bethlehem University, and Birzeit University and in refugee camps in Palestine, Lebanon and Jordan. Annemarie is also a mentor for eQuinoxe Screenwriting Lab and Doha Film Institute.

She is co-founder of the newly established artist-run space Dar Yusuf Nasri Jacir for Art & Research in her hometown of Bethlehem, Palestine. She has served as a jury member to numerous festivals including in Cannes (2018) and Berlinale (2020), is a member of the Academy of Motion Picture Arts and Sciences as well as the British Academy of Film and Television Arts (BAFTA).

Poetry
Jacir's poetry and stories have been published in numerous literary journals and anthologies, including Mizna, the Crab Orchard Review, and The Poetry of Arab Women: A Contemporary Anthology and she has read with poet Amiri Baraka. She has won several screenwriting awards and was a finalist for the Grand Prix du Meilleur Scenariste in Paris.

Curator
She is chief curator and founder of the groundbreaking Dreams of a Nation Palestinian cinema project, dedicated to the promotion of Palestinian cinema. In 2003, she organized and curated the largest traveling film festival in Palestine, which included the screening of archival Palestinian films from Revolution Cinema, screening for the first time on Palestinian soil. She has taught courses at Columbia University, Bethlehem University, Birzeit University and in refugee camps in Palestine and Lebanon. She works as a freelance editor and cinematographer as well as film curator. Jacir is a board member of Alwan for the Arts, a cultural organization devoted to North African and Middle Eastern art. She is a founding member of the Palestinian Filmmakers' Collective, based in Palestine.

Awards
Her 2012 film When I Saw You, which starred Saleh Bakri, Ruba Blal and Mahmoud Asfa, won the NETPAC Critics Award for Best Asian Film at the 63rd Berlin International Film Festival and was selected as the Palestinian entry for the Best Foreign Language Oscar at the 85th Academy Awards.

Her 2017 film Wajib, starred Saleh Bakri opposite his father, veteran actor Mohammad Bakri. It won them 36 international awards including Best Film in Mar Del Plata, Dubai, Amiens, DC Film Festival, Kosovo and Kerala and the jury mention at the London BFI Festival. For Saleh and Mohammad Bakri's roles in the film, it won the Muhr Award for Best Actor together, and won Jacir the Muhr Award for Best Fiction Feature at the Dubai International Film Festival 2017.

Filmography
 From Palestine with Love (postcard from the future) (2022)
 Ramy (TV series) (2021)
 Wajib (2017)
 When I Saw You (2012)
 Salt of this Sea (2008)
 An Explanation – And Then Burn the Ashes (2006)
 Quelques miettes pour les oiseaux (2005)
 like twenty impossibles (2003)
 The Satellite Shooters (2001)
 A Post Oslo History (2001)

See also
 Dar Yusuf Nasri Jacir for Art and Research

References

Articles (partial list)
 Farhat, Maymanah The Chicago Palestine Film Festival's Evening of Shorts
 Annemarie Jacir: For Cultural Purposes Only, Dreams of a Nation, 2002
 Annemarie Jacir: Coming Home: Palestinian Cinema, 27 February 2007, The Electronic Intifada
 Rebecca Kemp: Palestine On Film, Interviews with Palestinian Filmmakers, Fall 2006
 Annemarie Kattan Jacir: A Tale of Two Sisters: Witnessing an Undercover Israeli Operation in Ramallah (1), 15 November 2006, The Electronic Intifada
 Brentjes, Rana: The multiple layers of identity in Annemarie Jacir`s films, Deutscher Orientalistentag, 2003
 Annemarie Jacir: Letter from the editing room Paris, December 2007, This week in Palestine
 Annemarie Jacir: Another denial of entry for a film-maker…, May 1, 2008, Denied Entry

External links
 Salt of this Sea Cannes Premiere, 2008
 Palestinian filmmakers beat the odds to hit silver screen, April 22, 2009, CNN
 Annemarie Jacir: Artist and filmmaker at IMEU.net
 Rasha Salti: "Stranger than paradise", September 9, 2008, The National
 Rasha Salti: "Palestinian filmmaker Annemarie Jacir shines at Cannes festival", November 16, 2008

21st-century Palestinian women writers
21st-century Palestinian writers
Hockaday School alumni
Living people
Palestinian photographers
Palestinian women film directors
Palestinian film directors
Palestinian women poets
People from Bethlehem
Academic staff of Birzeit University

Year of birth missing (living people)